Acronychia eungellensis, commonly known as Eungella aspen, is a species of small rainforest tree that is endemic to a restricted area in east-central Queensland. It has simple, elliptic leaves on cylindrical stems, flowers in small groups in leaf axils, and fleshy fruit that is elliptic to egg-shaped in outline.

Description

Taxonomy
Acronychia eungellensis was first formally described in 1982 by Thomas Gordon Hartley and Bernard Hyland in the journal Austrobaileya from specimens collected in the Eungella National Park.

Distribution and habitat

Conservation status
Eungella aspen is classified as "near threatened" under the Queensland Government Nature Conservation Act 1992.

References

eungellensis
Flora of Queensland
Plants described in 1982
Taxa named by Thomas Gordon Hartley
Taxa named by Bernard Hyland